George Henry Davis (5 June 1881 – 28 April 1969) was an English football player and coach, known for his time with Derby County and the England national team, playing as an outside left.

Early and personal life
Born in Alfreton, Davis was the second youngest of eight children. In 1901 he was still living with his parents, and working as an assistant to his father as a greengrocer. By 1911 he was married with four children, and working as the hotelier of the Plough Inn in Alfreton.

Career
Davis played for Alfreton Town, Derby County, Birchwood Colliery, Riddings United, Ripley Ivanhoe, South Normanton Athletic, Stoneyford and Codnor Town.

While playing with Derby he was a runner-up in the 1903 FA Cup Final, and earned two caps for England in 1904.

Later life
He emigrated to Canada in 1912, playing for Calgary Hillhurst (winning the Canadian Cup in 1922) and coaching Manitoba. He returned to England in the 1950s, dying in Wimbledon.

References

1881 births
1969 deaths
English footballers
England international footballers
English football managers
Alfreton Town F.C. players
Derby County F.C. players
South Normanton Athletic F.C. players
English Football League players
Association football outside forwards
English expatriate footballers
Expatriate soccer players in Canada
English expatriate football managers
Expatriate soccer managers in Canada
English expatriate sportspeople in Canada
FA Cup Final players